Gaius Duilius ( 260–231 BC) was a Roman general and statesman. As consul in 260 BC, during the First Punic War, he won Rome's first ever victory at sea by defeating the Carthaginians at the Battle of Mylae. He later served as censor in 258, and was appointed dictator to hold elections in 231, but never held another command.

Background
Gaius Duilius, whose father and grandfather were both named Marcus Duilius, belonged to a undistinguished family. One Caeso Duilius is recorded as consul in 336 BC, but the surname is otherwise only known historically and reliably from a few minor magistrates in the fourth century BC.

Career

Naval victory
Duilius was one of the consuls for the year 260 BC, and was initially appointed to command Rome's land forces in Sicily against Carthage, as part of the First Punic War. His colleague in office, Gnaeus Cornelius Scipio, held charge of the fleet. The Romans built 120 warships and despatched them to Sicily in 260 BC for their crews to carry out basic training. Scipio sailed with the first 17 ships to arrive to the Lipari Islands, a little way off the north-east coast of Sicily, in an attempt to seize the islands' main port, Lipara. When Hannibal heard of the Romans' move he despatched 20 ships. When these attacked, Scipio's inexperienced men offered little resistance and the consul himself was taken prisoner. All of the Roman ships were captured, most with little damage. This forced Duilius to hand over the legions to the tribunes and assume control of the Roman fleet himself. A little later, Hannibal was scouting with 50 Carthaginian ships when he encountered the full Roman fleet. He escaped, but lost most of his ships. 

Manoeuvring galleys at sea required long and arduous training. As a result, the Romans were at a disadvantage against the more experienced Carthaginians. This allowed Roman legionaries acting as marines to board enemy ships and capture them, rather than employing the previously traditional tactic of ramming.

Duilius, hearing that a Carthaginian squadron under Hannibal Gisco was attacking Mylae, promptly sailed, seeking battle. The two fleets met off the coast of Mylae in the Battle of Mylae. Hannibal had 130 ships, and the historian John Lazenby calculates that Duilius had approximately the same number. The Carthaginians anticipated victory, due to the superior experience of their crews, and their faster and more manoeuvrable galleys, and broke formation to close rapidly with the Romans. Seeing this, the remaining Carthaginians swung wide, attempting to take the Romans in the sides or rear. The Romans successfully countered and captured a further 20 Carthaginian vessels. The surviving Carthaginians broke off the action, and being faster than the Romans were able to escape. This clash was Rome's first ever naval victory. Duilius sailed to relieve the Roman-held city of Segesta, which had been under siege.

Further successes
Following his victory at sea, Duilius resumed his command of the legions in Sicily. Landing probably at the gulf of Termini, he relieved Segesta of its siege by the Carthaginian Hamilcar, and then stormed the fortress of Macella (possibly Macellaro near Camporeale). As his term as consul neared its end, Duilius returned to Rome to hold elections and to celebrate, in early 259, the first Roman triumph for a naval victory. With part of the spoils, Duilius built a temple to Janus at the Forum Holitorium, and a column adorned with the ramming beaks of captured warships was erected in the Forum to celebrate his victory. He was also accorded the special honour of being accompanied by a torchbearer and flute-player while returning home from dinner at night.

Duilius went on to hold the office of censor in 258–257, and was later, in 231, appointed dictator to hold elections. He was said to have lived to old age, and Cato the Censor may have claimed to have seen the aged Duilius during his own childhood. Despite this, Duilius never held another military command, though he may have participated in a raid on Africa in 247. Lazenby suggested that, since he lacked an aristocratic pedigree, the nobility "may have got tired of his boastfulness", if the tone of the commemorative inscription attached to his column reflects his own attitude.

Legacy

In the Twentieth Century, the Italian Navy named several warships after Duilius, including the battleship .

Due to Duilius' victory being commemorated with a column adorned with the ramming beaks of captured warships being erected in the Forum, behind where speakers were standing when delivering a speech, the word "Rostrum" gained in Latin - and thence to various modern languages - the meaning of referring to a dais.

Notes, citations and sources

Notes

Citations

Sources

 
 
 
 
 
 
 
 
 

3rd-century BC Roman consuls
Gaius
Ancient Roman admirals
Roman censors
Roman commanders of the First Punic War
Ancient Roman dictators
Roman triumphators